Bairola  is a village in the quili patti of Tehri Garhwal district of the Uttarakhand state of India where Uniyal Brahmins live.

Villages in Tehri Garhwal district